Irma Nioradze (born June 15, 1969 in Tbilisi, Georgia), is a Georgian ballerina and Principal Dancer of the Kirov-Mariinsky Ballet.

Biography 
Irma Nioradze was born in Tbilisi (Georgia).

1987 - the graduation of Tbilisi Choreographic School. Her teachers were Serafima Vekua and Vakhtang Chabukiani.

1987-1988 - study on probation at Saint Petersburg Choreographic School named after Vaganova. The teacher was Ludmila Safronova.

1989-1990 - the ballet dancer of Tbilisi Opera and Ballet Theatre named after Z.P. Paliashvili. Her repertoire included the leading parts in Giselle, Serenade and one-act ballets of G. Alksidze.

1990 - the prize-winner of the International Ballet Competition in Jackson, Mississippi, USA. The tutor was Natalia Zolotova. She was coached by Vladimir Djouloukhadze who also performed as her non-competitive partner

1991 - private theatrical concern Nina Ananiashvili and Her Friends. Work on probation in Dutch Royal Ballet (Copenhagen).

Since 1992 the soloist of the Mariinsky Theatre Ballet Company. The teachers are Olga Moiseeva and Ninel Kurgapkina (since 1994).

Nioradze toured with the Mariinsky Ballet Company, she danced in Great Britain, USA, Holland, Japan, France, Italy, Spain, Denmark, Norway, Taiwan, Argentina, Brazil, Israel, Chile, Greece, Cyprus and Austria.

Her repertoire includes the leading roles in Giselle, Raymonda, The Firebird, Odette/Odile in Swan Lake, Medora in Le Corsaire, Mekhmene-Banu in The Legend of Love, Kitri in Don Quixote, Zarema in The Fountain of Bakhchisarai, Lilac Fairy in Sleeping Beauty, Nikiya in La Bayadere, the soloist in Symphony in C, the leading part in Paquita, Zobeide in Scheherazade, Baja in Goya Divertissement.

From the very beginning of her career it was evident that Irma Nioradze possesses all qualities to become the classical ballerina in the best meaning of this word. Indeed, her talent was so outstanding that her future was being discussed with great interest even while she was still a student of the Ballet Academy.

Repertoire 
 Sleeping Beauty : Lilac Fairy
 Swan Lake : Odette / Odile
 Le Corsaire : Medora
 La Bayadere : Nikiya / Gamzatti
 The Fountain of Bakhchisarai : Zarema
 Don Quixote : Kitri
 Giselle : Giselle
 Leading part in Paquita
 Scheherazade : Zobeide
 The Firebird : Firebird
 The Legend of Love : Mekhmeme-Banu
 Symphony in C : First movement
 Carmen : Carmen
 Le poéme de l'extase
 Le baiser de la fée : Fairy
 Jewels : Rubies
 Raymonda : Raymonda
 Manon : Manon
 Cinderella : Stepmother
 The Magic Nut : Temptress
 Romeo and Juliet : Juliet

Awards 
 Prizewinner of The International Ballet Competition (Jackson, 1991)
 Order of Honour (Georgia) (1996)
 Meritorious Artist of Russia (2002)
 Won the Baltika prize (2010)
 People's Artist of Russia (2011)

See also
 List of Russian ballet dancers

References

External links 
 Irma Nioradze website
 Short Bio at the Mariinsky Theatre site
 Short Bio at the Hermitage Ballet site
 The Ballerina Gallery

Prima ballerinas
Ballerinas from Georgia (country)
People's Artists of Russia
1969 births
Living people
Female dancers from Tbilisi